Bridgeport  is a neighbourhood that is part of the former town of Glace Bay, Nova Scotia in the Canadian province of Nova Scotia, located in the Cape Breton Regional Municipality on Cape Breton Island.

References
  Bridgeport on Destination Nova Scotia

Communities in the Cape Breton Regional Municipality
General Service Areas in Nova Scotia